, literally translated as The Data Slingshot: The scientific trade journal for data voyagers, is a German hacker magazine that is published at irregular intervals by the Chaos Computer Club (CCC).

Topics include primarily political and technical aspects of the digital world (freedom of information, data privacy (data protection), closed-circuit television, personal privacy (personal rights), cryptography and many more).

 was first published in 1984 and also can be subscribed to independently of a membership in the CCC. The founder is Herwart Holland Moritz. All (more than 90) back issues are freely available on the Internet as well. The current print paper format is DIN A5 as per ISO 216. Its editorial process is carried out over the Internet, while the magazine itself is printed in and distributed from Hamburg.

Issue #92 from March 2008 contained a reproduction of a fingerprint from Wolfgang Schäuble, the interior minister of Germany at the time.

The US phreaking magazine TAP – The Youth International Party Line (YIPL) (founded in 1971) has been described as a model for Datenschleuder.

See also
 Chaos Computer Club
 Chaos Digest (ChaosD)

References

External links
 

1984 establishments in West Germany
Computer magazines published in Germany
German-language magazines
Hacker magazines
Irregularly published magazines published in Germany
Magazines established in 1984
Magazines published in Hamburg
Works about computer hacking